Dmitri Petrovich Sokolov (20 May 1924 – 4 July 2009) was a Russian biathlon competitor who won one gold and three silver medals at the world championships in 1958–61. He competed at the 1960 Winter Olympics and finished sixth.

Life and work

After graduating from school Sokolov worked at a cement factory in Chelyabinsk and between 1942 and 1952 served in the Red Army (from 1946 – Soviet Army). He fought in World War II and in 1985 was awarded the Order of the Patriotic War. 

In 1952-1958 he lived in Kurgan, Kurgan Oblast, worked as a coach in skiing and biathlon.

In 1958–1964 he lived in Ufa, Bashkir Autonomous Soviet Socialist Republic, while competing himself, Sokolov coached biathlon and cross-country skiing.

Since 1966 he lived in Kurgan, Kurgan Oblast,

Buried in the Zajkovskoe cemetery in Kurgan, Kurgan Oblast, Russia.

Awards and honours
 Order of the Patriotic War 2nd class (1985)
 Medal "For Distinguished Labour" (1959)
 Medal "For the Victory over Germany in the Great Patriotic War 1941–1945" (1945)
  (1965)
  (1995)

References

1924 births
2009 deaths
Biathletes at the 1960 Winter Olympics
Soviet male biathletes
Olympic biathletes of the Soviet Union
Biathlon World Championships medalists
Burials in Kurgan, Kurgan Oblast
Soviet military personnel of World War II